Rowberrow is a small village, within the parish of Shipham, near Churchill and Shipham in Somerset, England.

Rowberrow is close to the Dolebury Warren Iron Age hill fort.

The parish was part of the Winterstoke Hundred.

It was formerly a mining parish producing calamine.

Church 

The parish Church of St Michael and All Angels dates from the late 14th century, however the nave, chancel and south porch were rebuilt in 1865. It is a Grade II* listed building.

Notable residents 
The author Terry Pratchett lived in Rowberrow from 1970 to 1993.

The author and cat lover Doreen Tovey lived in Rowberrow from the early fifties until her death in 2008.

References

External links 

Villages in Sedgemoor